The 1971 New South Wales Rugby Football League premiership was the sixty-fourth season of Sydney's professional rugby league football competition, Australia's first. Twelve teams, including six foundation clubs and another six admitted since 1908, competed for the J. J. Giltinan Shield during the season, which culminated in a Grand Final match for the W.D. & H.O. Wills between the South Sydney and St. George clubs.

Season summary
The season saw the number of tackles in a set increased from four to six. In addition, the number of points awarded for a field goal was reduced from two to one.

Each side met all others twice in twenty-two regular season rounds, resulting in the top four teams consisting of Manly-Warringah, South Sydney, St. George and Parramatta who fought out three finals for the right to play in the Grand Final.

The 1971 Rothmans Medal was won by South Sydney's five-eighth Denis Pittard while Rugby League Week awarded their player of the year award to South Sydney's halfback Bob Grant.

This season marked the end of a 23-year run where all but two of the premierships were won by St. George or South Sydney.

The 1971 season saw a ban imposed by the NSWRL on TV coverage of games in the Sydney premiership. It was believed that TV coverage was a contributing factor to falling attendances at games. As a result, only the Grand Final was televised, and even then as a one-hour late night highlights package rather than live coverage. The ban was lifted for the 1972 season onwards, as in practice it was shown to have negligible effect on match attendances.

Teams

Ladder

Finals
Under the guidance of revolutionary head-coach Jack Gibson who was in 1971 beginning to embrace the attitude and training methods used in the United States' National Football League, St. George in 1971 had reached the Grand Final in all three grades. They were to lose all three matches. (5–11 v Canterbury-Bankstown in Third Grade; 5–19 v Canterbury-Bankstown in Reserve Grade and 10–16 v South Sydney in the top grade).

Grand Final

Against a battle-hardened South Sydney side with a larger pack, the young Dragons went into the Grand Final as clear underdogs. Only Smith, Madison and Langlands for St. George had Grand Final experience of the level enjoyed by the entire Rabbitoh pack. Many of the Rabbitohs were playing in their fourth or fifth successive Grand Final.

The first half was a gruelling affair, with the sole point coming from an Eric Simms field goal. McCarthy crossed the Dragons’ try-line in the sixth minute but was called back on a forward pass ruling by referee Holman. Simms attempted a long-range field goal in the eighth minute which was unsuccessful, and Grant took another vain field goal shot minutes later. Souths dominated possession and field-position in the first fifteen minutes and were just held at bay by the rugged defence of the Dragons, especially from their centre, Clapham. Pittard made a  break at the fourteen-minute mark and was brought down  from the Dragons’ line by a desperate diving tackle from Smith. In the fifteenth minute Simms took another field goal attempt from dead in front and was successful. Souths attack was free-flowing, and they kept the play alive with late offloads whilst St. George adopted a more structured play of one-off running or moving the ball across the backline. In the twentieth minute Beath was stopped in the Souths' corner by a classy Coote cover tackle.

Langlands missed two penalty goal attempts in the first half, one mid-way through the period and another shortly before the break. Only Beath and Smith regularly broke through Souths' defences. At the interval Souths were in front by the unlikely scoreline of 1–0.

When play resumed Souths continued with their adventurous style of keeping the ball alive, they broke through poor Dragon defence and Branighan scored in the corner. Simms hit the post with the conversion attempt. Cox had replaced Bowen for St. George at half-time. Sattler tested out Cox early in the half with niggle and surreptitious fouls and appeared to eye-gouge Langlands in the 55th minute. The match began to turn spiteful at that point when Beath was penalised for using his knees on McCarthy. Coote scored the second try after a break by Sait, Simms converted and then added a penalty goal a few minutes later. At this stage Souths held an 11–0 lead and looked to be racing away with the match as St. George failed to complete tackles allowing the Rabbitohs to continually off-load.

The Dragons then rallied and fought back with a try to Barry Beath after a brave blind-side fifth tackle move by Billy Smith which was followed by a magnificent sideline conversion from Langlands. Smith was proving to be the Dragons’ only attacking spark until he was collared by Piggins and Sattler in a cynical head high tackle at the 65th minute. With the penalty that ensued Langlands took play to the other end of the field and Ted Walton scored for St. George. Langlands again converted from out wide. With the score at 11–10 and only twelve minutes remaining, Saints looked to be getting on top of their more fancied rivals. However a match-winning try two minutes from full-time by Bob McCarthy running freely off Ron Coote, showed the experience of the Rabbitohs, who took their fourth title in a five-year period.

McCarthy and Coote had starred for Souths and continually threatened to split the Dragons' defence. Souths hooker George Piggins who had been called into the side to replace regular season rake Elwyn Walters, was hailed as a hero, playing himself to a standstill in what was ultimately a closely fought encounter.

The victory was to be South Sydney's last for a period of 43 years, with the club not to win another Premiership until 2014.

 South Sydney 16 (Tries: Branighan, Coote, McCarthy. Goals: Simms 3. Field Goal: Simms.)

 St. George 10 (Tries: Beath, Walton. Goals: Langlands 2.)

Player statistics
The following statistics are as of the conclusion of Round 22.

Top 5 point scorers

Top 5 try scorers

Top 5 goal scorers

Notes

References

External links
 Rugby League Tables - Season 1971 The World of Rugby League
 Results:1971-80 at rabbitohs.com.au
 1971 J J Giltinan Shield and WD & HO Wills Cup at rleague.com
 NSWRFL season 1971 at rugbyleagueproject.com

1971 in Australian rugby league
New South Wales Rugby League premiership